Restorative dentistry is the study, diagnosis and integrated management of diseases of the teeth and their supporting structures and the rehabilitation of the dentition to functional and aesthetic requirements of the individual. Restorative dentistry encompasses the dental specialties of endodontics, periodontics and prosthodontics and its foundation is based upon how these interact in cases requiring multifaceted care.  This may require the close input from other dental specialties such as orthodontics, paediatric dentistry and special care dentistry, as well as surgical specialties such as oral and maxillofacial surgery.

Restorative dentistry aims to treat the teeth and their supporting structures.  Many conditions and their consequences may be assessed and treated by a restorative dentist.  Environmental causes may include as caries or maxillofacial trauma.  Developmental issues may lead to the restorative dentist treating hypodontia, amelogenesis imperfecta, dentogenesis imperfecta or cleft palate.  Multifactorial conditions, with an environmental and genetic basis, such as periodontitis would be treated by restorative dentistry.  Restorative dentists are part of the multidisciplinary team managing head and neck oncology cases, both before treatment and helping to rehabilitate the patient after surgery and/or radiotherapy.

In the UK, restorative dentistry is legally recognized as a specialty under EU directive and the General Dental Council, and is represented by several specialist societies including the British Society for Restorative Dentistry and the Association of Consultants & Specialists in Restorative Dentistry.  Restorative dentistry specialty training in the UK lasts 5 years, and upon successful completion the dentist may be appointed as a consultant in restorative dentistry.

Restorative dental treatments
Restorative dentistry combines the three dental monospecialties of endodontics, prosthodontics and periodontics. Restorative consultants work within dental hospital environments and receive referrals from other dental specialties and general dental practitioners. They may provide a treatment planning service or provide 'shared care' with the referring dentist. Restorative dentists manage complex cases that would be difficult to manage in general dental practice that include, but are not limited to: 
 Pre-radiotherapy head and neck oncology assessments
 Oral rehabilitation of patients after head and neck oncology treatment
 Provision of obturators for head and neck oncology and cleft palate patients
 Oral rehabilitation of hypodontia patients
 Oral rehabilitation of maxillofacial trauma patients
 Management of tooth wear cases
 Root canal therapy - both non-surgical and surgical
 Periodontal treatment - both non-surgical and surgical

References

 
Dentistry branches